Chendai is a town within Jinjiang county-level city, Quanzhou prefecture-level city of China's Fujian Province. It is located a few miles south of Quanzhou central city, and just north of Quanzhou Jinjiang Airport.

Quanzhou
Jinjiang, Fujian
Township-level divisions of Fujian